Rhinoleptus koniagui, also known commonly as Villiers's blind snake, is a species of snake in the family Leptotyphlopidae. The species, which is indigenous to West Africa, is monotypic in the genus Rhinoleptus. It is among the smallest snakes in the world. There are no subspecies that are recognized as being valid.

Geographic range
R. koniagui is found in West Africa in Senegal (Bonghari and Casamance) and Guinea (Kouroussa and Youkounkoun). The type locality given is "Guinée Francaise: Youkounkoun" (Guinea).

Habitat

Reproduction
R. koniagui is oviparous.

References

Further reading
Orejas-Miranda B, Roux-Estève R, Guibé J (1970). "Un nouveau genre de Leptotyphlopides (Ophidia) Rhinoleptus koniagui (Villiers)". Comunicaciones Zoológicas del Museo de Historia Natural de Montevideo 10 (127): 1–4. (Rhinoleptus, new genus). (in French).
Villiers A (1956). "Le Parc National du Niokolo-Koba 1 : V. Reptiles ". Mémoires du l'Institut Français d'Afrique Noir, Dakar 48: 143–162. (Typhlops koniagui, new species). (in French).

Leptotyphlopidae
Monotypic reptile genera
Reptiles described in 1956
Taxa named by Jean Marius René Guibé